Dino Nardin (30 May 1932 – 7 August 2010) was an Italian rower. He competed in the men's eight event at the 1952 Summer Olympics.

References

External links
 

1932 births
2010 deaths
Italian male rowers
Olympic rowers of Italy
Rowers at the 1952 Summer Olympics
Place of birth missing
People from Jesolo
Sportspeople from the Metropolitan City of Venice